The Lorraine was an automobile built in Grand Rapids, Michigan by the Lorraine Motors Corporation from 1920 to 1922.

History 
The Lorraine was an assembled car that succeeded the Hackett.  The vehicle was powered by a four-cylinder Herchell-Spillman engine and was available in both open and closed models.  Only a few hundred cars were sold.

Prices ranged from $1,695 to $2,590,. Plans for David Dunbar Buick to build a larger Lorraine with an IOE engine did not go past the prototype stage before the company declared bankruptcy.

External links 
 Lorraine Touring Car - Grand Rapids Public Museum

References

Defunct motor vehicle manufacturers of the United States
Motor vehicle manufacturers based in Michigan
Defunct manufacturing companies based in Michigan
Vintage vehicles
1920s cars
Cars introduced in 1920
Vehicle manufacturing companies established in 1920
Vehicle manufacturing companies disestablished in 1922